"Avalon" is a song by British rapper Professor Green, taken from his second studio album, At Your Inconvenience. The track features vocals from singer-songwriter Sierra Kusterbeck. The track serves as the album's fourth official single, and was released as a digital download in the United Kingdom on 16 September 2012. For its single release, the track has been remixed, with a heavier, guitar-laden sound. A music video to accompany the release of "Avalon" was filmed on 23 August 2012. Kusterbeck appeared in the video alongside Green.

Prior to release, the song featured on the first ever Relentless TV advert featuring footage of Professor Green drinking the energy drink whilst vandalizing cars by walking on top of their roofs, and  performing the track live alongside Sierra Kusterbeck. For the advert, the lyric in the first verse was adjusted in order to mention Relentless. The video was directed by Ross Cairns and filmed at various locations in London. Professor Green is a Relentless Energy Drink brand ambassador.

Track listing

Charts

Release history

References

2012 singles
Virgin Records singles
Professor Green songs
Song recordings produced by Mojam
Songs written by Professor Green
Songs written by Mustafa Omer
Songs written by Emeli Sandé
2011 songs